George Caldwell Taylor (May 29, 1885 – December 19, 1952) was a United States district judge of the United States District Court for the Eastern District of Tennessee.

Education and career

Born in Greeneville, Tennessee, Taylor received an Artium Baccalaureus degree from Tusculum College in 1906 and a Bachelor of Laws from the University of Tennessee College of Law in 1908. He was in private practice in Rockwood, Tennessee from 1908 to 1911. He was Secretary to the Governor of Tennessee from 1911 to 1913, thereafter returning to his private practice in Greeneville until 1921. He was the United States Attorney for the Eastern District of Tennessee from 1921 to 1928.

Federal judicial service

Taylor was nominated by President Calvin Coolidge on May 24, 1928, to a seat on the United States District Court for the Eastern District of Tennessee vacated by Judge Xenophon Hicks. He was confirmed by the United States Senate on May 26, 1928, and received his commission the same day. He served as Chief Judge from 1948 to 1949. He assumed senior status due to a certified disability on November 2, 1949. His service terminated on December 19, 1952, due to his death.

References

Sources
 

1885 births
1952 deaths
People from Greeneville, Tennessee
Tusculum University alumni
United States Attorneys for the Eastern District of Tennessee
Judges of the United States District Court for the Eastern District of Tennessee
United States district court judges appointed by Calvin Coolidge
20th-century American judges
University of Tennessee College of Law alumni